Pinky Parikh is an Indian actress from Gujarat, India. She is well known for her act in Ramanand Sagar's Shri Krishna (1994) as Rukmini, which starred Sarvadaman D. Banerjee as Krishna. She also acted in various Indian TV serials and films. She has won various awards including best actress of the year from the state government of Gujarat for her work in the movie Mann, Moti 'Ne Kaach.

In 2021 she took a lead part in a new TV series, "Moti Baa Ni Nani Vahu" set in Gujarat.

Awards
 Gujarat State Film Awards for Best Actress for Mann, Moti 'Ne Kaach (1999–2000)

Filmography

Actress

References

External links
 

Actresses from Gujarat
Living people
Year of birth missing (living people)
Indian stage actresses
Indian television actresses
Indian film actresses
Actresses in Gujarati cinema
Actresses in Hindi television
20th-century Indian actresses
21st-century Indian actresses